

Films

1962 in LGBT history
LGBT
1962
1962